Calverton is a civil parish in the unitary authority area of the City of Milton Keynes, Buckinghamshire, England and just outside the Milton Keynes urban area, near Stony Stratford. The parish consists of one village, Lower Weald and two hamlets: Upper Weald and Middle Weald. Lower Weald is the largest of the three settlements, and Manor Farm, the parish church and the former parochial school are within its boundaries.

The settlement name is Old English, and means 'farm where calves are reared'. In the Domesday Book of 1086 the village was recorded as Calvretone.

The west side of nearby Stony Stratford was once included with the ecclesiastic parish of Calverton (the east side being in Wolverton). "The manorial rights over the west side were held with those of Calverton, [which] led to the manor of Calverton being often called 'the manor of Calverton with Stony Stratford', and the fair and market of Stony Stratford were included among its appurtenances, until an Act of Parliament in the 18th century separated them.

The parish of Calverton was part of Stratford and Wolverton Rural District from 1894 to 1919, when the rural district became an urban district, subsequently renamed Wolverton urban district in 1920.  The area was re-established as a separate parish in 2001.

The parish church is dedicated to All Saints. "It was rebuilt in stone in the 12th- and 14th-century styles between 1818 and 1824, when some of the old details were re-used".

On 2 August 2011, the Grade 2* Listed Building Calverton Manor featured in BBC2's Restoration Home television series. The manor was sold in 1616 to Sir Thomas Bennet, who had been Lord Mayor of London in 1603. It was extended in 1659 by his grandson Sir Simon Bennet. The manor is reputedly haunted by the ghost of Simon's wife, Lady Grace Bennett, who was murdered there in 1694. The Bennet family also owned the nearby manor of Beachampton.

References

External links

Areas of Milton Keynes
Civil parishes in Buckinghamshire